Novooleksandrivka is a village in Alchevsk Raion (district) in Luhansk Oblast of eastern Ukraine. The village borders in NW with Popasna city.

During the War in Donbas, that started in mid-April 2014, the separation line between the warring parties has been located in the vicinity of the settlement. In January 2018 the Ukrainian military regained control over the village.

Demographics
Native language as of the Ukrainian Census of 2001:
Ukrainian 93.55%
Russian 6.45%

References

External links
 Weather forecast for Novooleksandrivka
Bakhmutsky Uyezd

Villages in Alchevsk Raion